First Camp, sometimes referred to as First Camp Sverige is a  private chain of campgrounds in Sweden and Denmark. First Camp was founded in 2002 when five entrepreneurs within the Swedish tourism industry decided to start the first private chain of campgrounds in Sweden. In 2019, First Camp merged with the other major campsite chain in Scandinavia, Nordic Camping, which was rebranded to First Camp.
Following the merger, the group is Scandinavia's largest campsite chain with 39 campsites in Sweden and 5 in Denmark. Total revenues in 2019 reached almost 400 mn SEK.

References

External links
 First Camp's English site

Tourism in Sweden